John Angus Mackenzie Innes  (born 22 May 1939) was a Queensland politician and leader of the state Liberal Party.

Biography
Innes was elected to the Legislative Assembly of Queensland in 1978 representing the Brisbane-area seat of Sherwood at a by-election to fill a vacancy created by the death of John Herbert.  Campaigning heavily on opposition to the controversial street march legislation of then-premier Joh Bjelke-Petersen, Innes easily won the seat, relegating the ruling National Party to a distant fourth place.

Progressive by nature, Innes had little time for the conservative social policies of the National-dominated government, even though under the coalition agreement between the Nationals and the Liberals, he was nominally a government backbencher.  Innes became associated with a faction within the parliamentary Liberal Party dubbed by the media as the "ginger group", who frequently criticised government policy.  The Liberal leader at the time, Llew Edwards was more supportive of National party policy, and urged the unruly Liberal backbenchers to be "good coalitionists".

Innes did not agree with Edwards' assessment, and went as far as challenging him for the leadership of the party from the backbench.  While Edwards survived, it was only by twelve votes to ten, making the growing power of the Ginger Group faction plain for all to see.  The group eventually took power a year later when Terry White became Liberal leader and Innes replaced Sam Doumany as deputy leader.  This arrangement did not last long, however.  When Bjelke-Petersen refused to appoint White as deputy premier, he and Innes pulled the Liberals out of the Coalition and led them to the crossbenches.  In the ensuing 1983 election, Bjelke-Petersen convinced many right-leaning Liberal voters that White and Innes might join forces with Labor.  As a result, the Liberals were reduced to a rump of only eight members.  White and Innes were the only members of the "ginger group" to retain their seats.  Two more defected to the Nationals, and Innes was deposed as deputy leader soon afterward.

Innes was reelected in 1986, helped by the fact that his National opponent forgot to submit the required paperwork in time. In January 1988, he became leader of the Liberal party, taking over from William Knox.

Innes led the Liberals into the 1989 election.  He hoped to recover some ground, but was well aware that if the Nationals lost significant ground in South East Queensland, many seats that could have theoretically been within striking distance for the Liberals could have fallen to Labor.  At that election, while the Liberals picked up a four percent swing, they actually lost two seats due in part to a massive Labor surge in Brisbane. Labor took all but five seats in the capital, allowing it to win government after 32 years in opposition.  Innes retired from parliament soon afterwards.

References

1939 births
Living people
Members of the Queensland Legislative Assembly
Liberal Party of Australia members of the Parliament of Queensland
Australian Members of the Order of the British Empire
Australian barristers
People educated at Queen Elizabeth's High School
University of Queensland alumni